The 2013 Superstars Series was the tenth year and final season of the Superstars Series, an Italian-based touring car racing series, featuring the tenth edition of the Campionato Italiano Superstars (Italian Superstars Championship) and the seventh and final season year of the International Superstars Series. The season began at Monza on 7 April and finished at the ACI Vallelunga Circuit on 13 October, after eight rounds. Audi Sport Italia driver Gianni Morbidelli won both the Italian and International championships, with Mercedes-AMG Romeo Ferraris driver Vitantonio Liuzzi resulting runner-up.

Teams and drivers
 All teams were Italian-registered and used Hankook tyres.

Calendar

Results

Notes

Championship standings
Scoring system

Campionato Italiano Superstars

† – Drivers did not finish the race, but were classified as they completed over 50% of the race distance.

International Superstars Series – Drivers

† – Drivers did not finish the race, but were classified as they completed over 50% of the race distance.

Teams' championship

References

External links
Official Superstars website

Superstars Series
Superstars Series
Superstars Series seasons